Fred Sayer (6 June 1913 – 7 April 1972) was an  Australian rules footballer who played with Hawthorn in the Victorian Football League (VFL).

Notes

External links 

1913 births
1972 deaths
Australian rules footballers from Victoria (Australia)
Hawthorn Football Club players
People educated at Scotch College, Melbourne